The Nolichucky Formation is a geologic formation in Virginia. It preserves fossils dating back to the Cambrian period.

See also

 List of fossiliferous stratigraphic units in Virginia
 Paleontology in Virginia

References
 

Cambrian geology of Virginia
Cambrian geology of Tennessee
Cambrian southern paleotemperate deposits